Odette Piñeiro (born July 28, 1965 in Manatí, Puerto Rico) is the former Secretary of Puerto Rico Department of Education, appointed by Governor Luis Fortuño on December 14, 2009, confirmed by the Senate of Puerto Rico on December 18, 2009 and sworn in by Secretary of State Kenneth McClintock on December 30, 2009.  She succeeded Dr. Carlos A. Chardón, who served as Fortuño's first Secretary of Education, and served until her resignation on May 28, 2010.

A majority party senator, Larry Seilhamer joined seven minority party legislators in opposing her confirmation.  Nevertheless, she was confirmed in a 20-8 vote.  Prior to her confirmation, she had been sworn in under a recess appointment five days before so that she could immediately take office and tackle multiple issues that the United States Department of Education was requiring be resolved by December 31, 2009.

Piñeiro is a graduate of the University of Puerto Rico at Mayagüez, and Penn State University in Pennsylvania.  In 1988, she married Jesús Edgardo Colón, the current mayor of Orocovis, Puerto Rico, with whom she has two sons, both college students, one at Penn State and the other in Puerto Rico.  She served as the town's First Lady until her separation several years ago.  As an educational researcher and consultant, she has worked in Central America, Pennsylvania and Puerto Rico, including a stint as an educational advisor to the U.S. territory's Senate under the presidencies of Kenneth McClintock and Thomas Rivera Schatz.

Piñeiro was fired as Secretary of Education on May 28, 2010.

References

Living people
Members of the 15th Cabinet of Puerto Rico
Pennsylvania State University alumni
People from Manatí, Puerto Rico
Secretaries of Education of Puerto Rico
Place of birth missing (living people)
1965 births